Cuveglio is a comune (municipality) in the Province of Varese in the Italian region Lombardy, located about  northwest of Milan and about  northwest of Varese.

The municipality of Cuveglio contains the frazioni (subdivisions, mainly villages and hamlets) Vergobbio, Cavona, and Canonica di Cuveglio.

Cuveglio borders the following municipalities: Casalzuigno, Cassano Valcuvia, Castello Cabiaglio, Cuvio, Duno, Rancio Valcuvia.

Demographic evolution

References

Cities and towns in Lombardy